Savaj Bolagh or Savojbolagh may refer to:
 Savojbolagh, Ardabil
 Savojbolagh, East Azerbaijan
 Savojbolagh County, in Alborz Province
 The former name of Mahabad in West Azerbaijan Province